Jedediah Strong House is a historic home located at Colonie in Albany County, New York.  It was built about 1795 and is a two-story, six bay wide dwelling with two symmetrically placed end chimneys in the Federal style. It features a small entrance portico with a hipped roof and supported by square columns. Also on the property is a contributing barn.

It was listed on the National Register of Historic Places in 1985.

References

Houses on the National Register of Historic Places in New York (state)
Federal architecture in New York (state)
Houses completed in 1795
Houses in Albany County, New York
National Register of Historic Places in Albany County, New York